Bon Accord is a town in central Alberta, Canada. The name is derived from the French phrase "Bon Accord", the ancient motto of Aberdeen, Scotland, the ancestral home of a first settler.

The International Dark-Sky Association designated Bon Accord an International Dark Sky Community in August 2015 in recognition of the town's implementation of initiatives to preserve and enhance dark night skies over the community. It was the first community in Canada and eleventh in the world to earn this designation.

Demographics 

In the 2016 Census of Population conducted by Statistics Canada, the Town of Bon Accord recorded a population of 1,529 living in 560 of its 578 total private dwellings, a  change from its 2011 population of 1,488.

See also 
List of communities in Alberta
List of towns in Alberta

References

External links 

1964 establishments in Alberta
Edmonton Metropolitan Region
Towns in Alberta